Choi Tae-hwan (born February 28, 1989) is a South Korean actor and model.

Filmography

Film

TV movies

Television series

References

External links
 

1989 births
Living people
21st-century South Korean male actors
South Korean male television actors
South Korean male film actors
South Korean male web series actors